Nashville Rehearsals is an album of studio sessions and rehearsals by the band King Crimson, released through the King Crimson Collectors' Club in November 2000. The band were working towards a new King Crimson studio album, but decided progress was unsatisfactory and did not develop these ideas further.

Track listing
"Presidents" (Adrian Belew, Bill Bruford Robert Fripp, Trey Gunn, Tony Levin, Pat Mastelotto) 7:04
"Scapeplay" (Belew, Bruford, Fripp, Gunn, Levin, Mastelotto) 3:37
"Snugel" (Belew, Bruford, Fripp, Gunn, Levin, Mastelotto) 5:45
"Off Sets" (Belew, Bruford, Fripp, Gunn, Levin, Mastelotto) 4:24
"Big Funk" (Belew, Bruford, Fripp, Gunn, Levin, Mastelotto) 3:30
"Jimmy Bond" (Belew, Bruford, Fripp, Gunn, Levin, Mastelotto) 7:07
"Have U Got?" (Belew, Bruford, Fripp, Gunn, Levin, Mastelotto) 1:05
"Mulundrum" (Belew, Bruford, Fripp, Gunn, Levin, Mastelotto) 0:39
"Too Many eeee's" (Belew, Bruford, Fripp, Gunn, Levin, Mastelotto) 1:11
"Nice to Start" (Belew, Bruford, Fripp, Gunn, Levin, Mastelotto) 0:13
"Pat's Mechanical Fives" (Belew, Bruford, Fripp, Gunn, Levin, Mastelotto) 3:04
"Seizure" (Belew, Bruford, Fripp, Gunn, Levin, Mastelotto) 0:51
"Circulation" (Belew, Bruford, Fripp, Gunn, Levin, Mastelotto) 1:03
"KCF" (Belew, Bruford, Fripp, Gunn, Levin, Mastelotto) 0:32
"Ragin' Drone" (Belew, Bruford, Fripp, Gunn, Levin, Mastelotto) 3:42
"JB in 7" (Belew, Bruford, Fripp, Gunn, Levin, Mastelotto) 2:41
"Split Hands" (Belew, Bruford, Fripp, Gunn, Levin, Mastelotto) 4:36
"Sad Woman Jam" (Belew, Bruford, Fripp, Gunn, Levin, Mastelotto) 2:36
"Tony's Jam" (Belew, Bruford, Fripp, Gunn, Levin, Mastelotto) 12:59
"Trey, Pat and Bill" (Bruford, Gunn, Mastelotto) 0:47

Personnel
Robert Fripp - guitar
Adrian Belew - guitar
Tony Levin - bass guitar, Chapman stick
Trey Gunn - Warr guitar
Bill Bruford - drums, percussion
Pat Mastelotto - drums, percussion

King Crimson Collector's Club albums
2000 albums